Rebecca Mike is a former territorial level politician from Pangnirtung, Nunavut.

Mike was elected to the Northwest Territories Legislature in the 1991 Northwest Territories general election. She won the Baffin Central electoral district defeating incumbent Ipeelee Kilabuk and former MLA Pauloosie Paniloo. Mike was appointed to the cabinet, serving until February 1995 when she was forced to resign her portfolios, after she filed an assault complaint in January 1995. Mike attended a Christmas party in December 1994, she alleged she was assaulted by a business man. Mike did not return to the Legislature in 1995.

References

Members of the Legislative Assembly of the Northwest Territories
Living people
People from Pangnirtung
Inuit politicians
Women MLAs in the Northwest Territories
Canadian Inuit women
Year of birth missing (living people)
Inuit from the Northwest Territories
Inuit from Nunavut